The 2013–14 Liga Națională season was the 64th season of the Liga Națională, the highest professional basketball league in Romania.

The first half of the season consisted of 14 teams and 182-game regular season (26 games for each of the 14 teams). The season began on 5 October 2013 and ended on 5 April 2014, just before the playoffs.

Preview
The 2013–14 season had only 14 teams after CSS Giurgiu give up his place and CSM Bucuresti merge with new promoted team Steaua Bucharest resulting Steaua CSM EximBank Bucharest. Because of this situation no team will be relegated at the end of the season. Regarding the international competition SCM U Craiova will play in Balkan League (BIBL). CS Gaz Metan Medias, BC Mures and CSM Oradea would play in the EuroChallenge, and CSU Asesoft Ploiesti would play in the Eurocup.

Teams

Playoffs

External links
Official site of the Romanian basketball federation
Halfcourt.info (Romanian and English)
Numaibaschet.ro (Romanian)
Baschetromania.ro (Romanian)

2016-17
Romanian
Lea